is a Japanese footballer currently playing as a forward for FC Tokyo.

Club career
Born in Fukushima Prefecture, Kumata joined FC Tokyo at under-15 level.

Career statistics

Club
.

Notes

References

2004 births
Living people
Association football people from Fukushima Prefecture
Japanese footballers
Japan youth international footballers
Association football forwards
FC Tokyo players